Kurama may refer to one of the following ships of the Japanese Navy:

 , an  armoured cruiser launched in 1907; re-classed as a battlecruiser in 1912; scrapped in 1923.
 , a  launched in 1979

Japanese Navy ship names